A Tauc plot is used to determine the optical bandgap, or Tauc bandgap, of either disordered or amorphous semiconductors.

In his original work Jan Tauc showed that the optical absorption spectrum of amorphous germanium resembles the spectrum of the indirect transitions in crystalline germanium (plus a tail due to localized states at lower energies), and proposed an extrapolation to find the optical bandgap of these crystalline-like states. Typically, a Tauc plot shows the quantity hν (the photon energy) on the abscissa (x-coordinate) and the quantity (αhν)1/2 on the ordinate (y-coordinate), where α is the absorption coefficient of the material. Thus, extrapolating this linear region to the abscissa yields the energy of the optical bandgap of the amorphous material.

A similar procedure is adopted to determine the optical bandgap of crystalline semiconductors. In this case, however, the ordinate is given by (α)1/r, in which the exponent 1/r denotes the nature of the transition:,, 
r = 1/2 for direct allowed transitions
r = 3/2 for direct forbidden transitions.
r = 2 for indirect allowed transitions
r = 3 for indirect forbidden transitions
Again, the resulting plot (quite often, incorrectly identified as a Tauc plot) has a distinct linear region that, extrapolated to the abscissa, yields the energy of the optical bandgap of the material.

See also 

 Band gap
 Urbach energy
 Semiconductor

References

Plots (graphics)
Thin films
Semiconductor analysis